Narcea is one of 8 comarcas administrative divisions of Asturias, which is a province and an autonomous community in Spain .

The comarca of Narcea is divided into five municipalities (in Asturian conceyos). From south to north they are:
Ibias
Degaña
Cangas del Narcea
Allande
Tineo

Comarcas of Asturias